Alin may refer to:

 Alin, Iran, a village
 Arid Lands Information Network, a Kenyan NGO
 Alin, a magical civilization in the video game Rise of Nations: Rise of Legends
 Alianza de Izquierda Nacional (Alliance of the National Left), a left-wing political party in Bolivia
 Oscar Alin (1846–1900), Swedish historian and politician
 Alin Goyan (born 1983), Armenian singer
 A-Lin (born 1983), aboriginal Taiwanese pop singer

See also